One More from the Road (styled as One More For From The Road) is a live album by Southern rock band Lynyrd Skynyrd, capturing three shows recorded in July 1976 at the Fox Theatre in Atlanta, Georgia. Since 1974 Lynyrd Skynyrd had supported rock promoter Alex Cooley so that the theatre could be saved from demolition. This record was the band's first live album, and the only live album from the band's classic era of 1970 to 1977, prior to the plane crash that killed lead singer and songwriter Ronnie Van Zant, guitarist Steve Gaines, and backing singer Cassie Gaines. The album was released in September 1976. It was certified gold by the RIAA on October 26, 1976, platinum on December 30, 1976 and 3× platinum on July 21, 1987.

The original 14 tracks include a cover of Jimmie Rodgers' "T for Texas" and an 11:30 version of "Free Bird".

The first CD release, in 1986, was a single disc omitting two tracks, "T For Texas" and "Travelin' Man", due to time constraints. The second CD release, in 1996, was a two-disc set with all 14 songs plus three bonus tracks: "Sweet Home Alabama", "Gimme Back My Bullets" and "Simple Man". The two-disc set put the tracks in the order of appearance of the original concert.

The deluxe edition, released in 2001, was remastered and contained additional performances from the Fabulous Fox Theatre in Atlanta. The bonus tracks are also available separately on a "Rarities Edition".

The live version of "Sweet Home Alabama" from this album was used as a track on the music rhythm video games Guitar Hero World Tour and Guitar Hero On Tour: Decades.

Track listing

Original double LP

Side one
"Workin' for MCA" (Ed King, Ronnie Van Zant) – 4:38
"I Ain't the One" (Gary Rossington, Van Zant) – 3:37
"Searching" (Allen Collins, Van Zant) – 3:51
"Tuesday's Gone" (Collins, Van Zant) – 7:39

Side two
"Saturday Night Special" (King, Van Zant) – 5:30
"Travelin' Man" (Van Zant, Leon Wilkeson) – 4:08
"Whiskey Rock-a-Roller" (King, Billy Powell, Van Zant) – 4:14
"Sweet Home Alabama" (King, Rossington, Van Zant) – 6:49

Side three
"Gimme Three Steps" (Collins, Van Zant) – 5:00
"Call Me the Breeze" (J.J. Cale) – 5:27
"T for Texas" (Jimmie Rodgers) – 8:26

Side four
"The Needle and the Spoon" (Collins, Van Zant) – 4:17
"Crossroads" (Robert Johnson) – 3:44
"Free Bird" (Collins, Van Zant) – 11:30

25th Anniversary Deluxe Edition (2001)

Disc 1
"Introduction by Alex Cooley/Workin' for MCA" (King, Van Zant) – 5:32 (July 7)
"I Ain't the One" (Rossington, Van Zant) – 3:47 (July 8)
"Saturday Night Special" (King, Van Zant) – 5:39 (July 8)
"Searching" (Collins, Van Zant) – 4:00 (July 9)
"Travelin' Man" (Van Zant, Wilkeson) – 4:37 (July 8)
"Simple Man" (Rossington, Van Zant) – 6:56 (July 7)
"Whiskey Rock-a-Roller" (King, Powell, Van Zant) – 4:48 (July 7)
"The Needle and the Spoon" (Collins, Van Zant) – 4:35 (July 8)
"Gimme Back My Bullets" (Rossington, Van Zant) – 4:01 (July 8)
"Tuesday's Gone" (Collins, Van Zant) – 8:25 (July 9)
"Gimme Three Steps" (Collins, Van Zant) – 5:11 (July 9)
"Call Me the Breeze" (Cale) – 5:51 (July 8)
"T For Texas (Blue Yodel #1)" (Rodgers) – 9:14 (July 8)

Disc 2
"Sweet Home Alabama" (King, Rossington, Van Zant)  – 7:29 (July 9)
"Crossroads" (Johnson) – 4:16 (July 9)
"Free Bird" (Collins, Van Zant) – 14:25 (July 8)
"Introduction by Alex Cooley/Workin' for MCA" (King, Van Zant) – 5:37 (July 8)
"I Ain't the One" (Rossington, Van Zant) – 3:52 (July 7)
"Searching" (Collins, Van Zant) – 4:13 (July 7)
"Gimme Three Steps" (Collins, Van Zant) – 4:42 (July 7)
"Call Me the Breeze" (Cale) – 5:43 (July 7)
"Sweet Home Alabama" (King, Rossington, Van Zant)  – 7:27 (July 8)
"Crossroads" (Johnson) – 4:46 (July 8)
"Free Bird" (Collins, Van Zant) – 14:48 (July 9)

Notes on the bonus tracks
Disc 1, Track 6 from Legend (1987)
Disc 1, Track 9 from the Anaheim Stadium Promo Single (1977)
Disc 2, Tracks 7-8, 10-11 from Collectybles (2000)
Disc 2, Track 9 from the 1996 reissue of the album
Disc 2, Tracks 4-6 are previously unreleased

Personnel
Ronnie Van Zant – lead vocals
Steve Gaines – guitar, vocals
Allen Collins – guitar
Gary Rossington – guitar
Leon Wilkeson – bass, vocals
Artimus Pyle – drums
Billy Powell – keyboards
JoJo Billingsley, Cassie Gaines, Leslie Hawkins – backing vocals
Sam McPherson—harmonica

Chart positions

Certifications

References

Albums produced by Tom Dowd
Lynyrd Skynyrd live albums
1976 live albums
MCA Records live albums